A list of films produced in the Soviet Union in 1945 (see 1945 in film).

1945

See also
1945 in the Soviet Union

References

External links
 Soviet films of 1945 at the Internet Movie Database

1945
Soviet
Films